Nunzio Lella (born 28 July 2000) is an Italian footballer who plays as a defender for  club Cagliari.

Club career

Bari
He is a product of youth teams of Bari. In 2016–17 and 2017–18 seasons he was occasionally called up to the senior squad but didn't see time on the field.

Cagliari
Following Bari's bankruptcy, on 3 August 2018 he joined Serie A club Cagliari. He mostly spent the 2018–19 season with their Under-19 squad. He was called up to the senior squad 5 times, but didn't make any appearances.

Loan to Olbia
On 17 July 2019 he joined Serie C club Olbia on a season-long loan.

He made his professional Serie C debut for Olbia on 25 August 2019 in a game against Siena. He started the game and was substituted after 65 minutes

The loan was renewed for the 2020–21 season on 28 August 2020.

On 12 August 2021 he extended his contract for Cagliari until 2024; on the same day he returned to Olbia, once again on loan.

References

External links
 

2000 births
Living people
Sportspeople from the Metropolitan City of Bari
Footballers from Apulia
Italian footballers
Association football defenders
Serie B players
Serie C players
S.S.C. Bari players
Cagliari Calcio players
Olbia Calcio 1905 players